Jane Harper (born 1980) is a British–Australian author known for her crime novels The Dry, Force of Nature and The Lost Man, all set in rural Australia.

Early life 
Born in Manchester in the UK, Harper moved to Australia with her family when she was eight. There, she lived in the outer Melbourne suburb of Boronia, and eventually acquired Australian citizenship. As a teen, Harper returned to the UK with her family and resided in Hampshire. Later, she attended the University of Kent and studied English. After spending time working on her career, she moved back to Australia.

Career 
After graduating with a degree in English and history, Harper gained an entry-level journalism qualification. She got her first job as a trainee at the Darlington & Stockton Times in County Durham. Later she was a senior news journalist for the Hull Daily Mail. In 2008 she returned to Australia to take up a reporting job at the Geelong Advertiser, then in 2011 became a journalist for the Herald Sun in Melbourne. Harper worked as a print journalist for 13 years before writing her first novel, The Dry, which was published in 2016.

The Dry 

The Dry, Harper's first novel, is a thriller set in a fictional town five hours west of Melbourne. A Federal Agent, Aaron Falk, returns to his old hometown to attend the funeral of his childhood best friend, Luke. Falk teams up with a local detective and tries to uncover the truth behind Luke's sudden mysterious death, only to find more questions than answers.

Force of Nature 
Harper's second thriller is set in the thickly forested mountains north-east of Melbourne, again featuring Federal Agent Aaron Falk. A group from a Melbourne tech company go on a retreat in the mountains, where Alice Russell, one of the women in the group, disappears while navigating the Mirror Falls trail. Falk has been investigating the company for financial irregularities, and the woman was his secret informer.

The Lost Man
Harper's third murder mystery is set in south-west Queensland on a large cattle station. The police find nothing in Cameron Bright's death from dehydration to suggest foul play, and the investigation is carried out informally by the dead man's elder brother Nathan.

The Survivors
In Harper's fourth murder mystery, the death of a young woman in a Tasmanian coastal town unearths questions around events during a storm 12 years earlier, when two men drowned and a girl disappeared.

Exiles
Visiting friends in South Australian wine country, Aaron Falk finds himself drawn into the investigation of the disappearance of a woman a year ago at the local food and wine festival, and the hit-and-run death of a man a few years before.

Awards and recognition 
In 2014, Big Issue published one of Harper's short stories. In the Victorian Premier's Literary Awards in 2015, Harper won an award for an unpublished manuscript (The Dry). In 2017, Harper won the Gold ABIA for Book of the Year and the Davitt Award for The Dry, and the Gold Dagger awarded by the Crime Writers' Association of the United Kingdom for the best crime novel of the year. Harper became a New York Times bestselling author for The Dry. Reese Witherspoon bought the rights to The Dry to turn it into a movie, which was released in January 2021.

The Lost Man was shortlisted for the 2020 Theakston's Old Peculier Crime Novel of the Year Award, and won the Barry Award for Best Mystery/Crime Novel in 2020.

The Survivors was shortlisted for the general fiction book of the year at the 2021 Australian Book Industry Awards. It was also shortlisted for the 2021 Colin Roderick Award.

Bibliography
Aaron Falk novels
 
 
 
Standalone novels

References

External links
 Author's website

1980 births
21st-century Australian novelists
21st-century Australian short story writers
21st-century Australian women writers
Alumni of the University of Kent
Australian crime fiction writers
Australian women novelists
Barry Award winners
British emigrants to Australia
Living people
People with acquired Australian citizenship
Women crime writers
Writers from Manchester
Writers from Victoria (Australia)